Robert Hogg (1818–1897) was a Scottish nurseryman and botanist. He was known as a pomologist who contributed to the science of classification. He published his book British Pomology in 1851, and co-edited The Florist and Pomologist: A Pictorial Monthly Magazine of Flowers, Fruits and General Horticulture.

Born in Duns, Berwickshire, on 20 April 1818, and educated at Edinburgh University, Hogg died on 14 March 1897 in Pimlico, London.

External links
 
Studies in the History of British Fruit, in Honour of the 150th Anniversary of Robert Hogg’s Fruit Manual; Occasional Papers from the RHS Lindley Library, volume 4, October 2010.

References

1818 births
1897 deaths
Scottish botanists
People from Duns, Scottish Borders
Pomologists
Scottish biologists
Scottish garden writers
Alumni of the University of Edinburgh
Scottish editors
Scottish horticulturists
Fellows of the Linnean Society of London
Nurserymen
19th-century Scottish businesspeople